Coulman Island is an ice-covered island in the Ross Sea, located  southeast of Cape Jones, Victoria Land, Antarctica. Emperor penguins inhabit this island. It was discovered in 1841 by Sir James Clark Ross who named it for his father-in-law, Thomas Coulman. A notable landmark of this island is Cape Anne, the south-easternmost point of the island, so named by Sir James Clark Ross for his wife. Cape Wadworth is the northernmost point of the island.

The island is composed of several overlapping shield volcanoes that form part of the Hallett Volcanic Province of the McMurdo Volcanic Group.

Important Bird Area (IBA)
The island was founded in 1841, however, the island is currently recognized as an important bird area because it holds a huge super-colony of emperor penguins and is the largest colony of this species in the world. However, scientists speculate that this colony could hold more birds than what they have estimated. More than 26,000 chicks have been counted during the 2018-2019 breeding season indicating that the number of adults ranged from 30,000 to 35,000 breeding pairs. The sheer numbers of penguins on the island had also led scientists to think that there have been potentially larger emperor penguin super-colonies that may have existed in the past before being wiped out during the last ice age.

See also
 Composite Antarctic Gazetteer
 List of Antarctic islands south of 60° S
 List of volcanoes in Antarctica
 Scientific Committee on Antarctic Research (SCAR)
 Territorial claims in Antarctica

References

External links

Volcanoes of Victoria Land
Islands of Victoria Land
Miocene shield volcanoes
Calderas of Antarctica
Borchgrevink Coast
Volcanic islands